John Randal Kleiser (born July 20, 1946) is an American film and television director, producer, screenwriter and actor, best known for directing the 1978 musical romantic-comedy film Grease.

Biography

John Randal Kleiser was born in Lebanon, Pennsylvania, the son of Harriet Kelly ( Means) and Dr. John Raymond Kleiser. He has two brothers. Kleiser attended Radnor High School.

As a freshman at the University of Southern California, he appeared in George Lucas' student film Freiheit. (Kleiser also lived in the house that Lucas was renting at the time.) Kleiser graduated in 1968. His award-winning Master's thesis film Peege launched his career and was selected for preservation by the United States Library of Congress National Film Registry in 2007.

Kleiser directed several television movies in the mid-1970s, including Dawn: Portrait of a Teenage Runaway (1975) and The Boy in the Plastic Bubble (1975), which starred John Travolta. Kleiser was tapped to direct his first feature film, the 1978 film Grease, in large part because of Travolta's recommendation based on their work together on The Boy in the Plastic Bubble.

Kleiser directed several more feature films, including The Blue Lagoon (1980) with Brooke Shields, Summer Lovers (1982) with Daryl Hannah, Grandview, U.S.A. (1984) with Jamie Lee Curtis, Flight of the Navigator (1986), featuring the first use of digital morphing in a film, Big Top Pee-wee (1988), White Fang (1991) and Honey, I Blew Up the Kid (1992). In London, Kleiser directed the comedy Getting It Right (1989). In 1996, he wrote and directed It's My Party. As a writer-producer, he was responsible for the surfing film North Shore (1987) for Universal Pictures. He also directed the thriller Shadow of Doubt (1998). In 1987, he had an agreement with upstart diversified film studio Management Company Entertainment Group to develop, direct and produce low-budget pictures that were financed by the studio, and he will shepherd indie projects of promising students and decided to build various international directors on its own.

Working in 70mm 3-D, he directed Honey, I Shrunk the Audience (1995) for the Disney theme parks in Anaheim, Orlando, Tokyo and Paris, re-teaming with most of the principal actors from Honey, I Blew Up the Kid. His television movies include The Boy in the Plastic Bubble (1976) with John Travolta, the Emmy Award-winning The Gathering (1977) and Dawn: Portrait of a Teenage Runaway (1976).

He taught a graduate workshop at USC and Masters Directing Classes for European students at film festivals in Deuville and Sarlat, and Malaga. He serves as a judge on the Student Awards for the Academy of Motion Picture Arts and Sciences; and, as chairman of the Academic Subcommittee for the Directors Guild of America, he inaugurated a videoconferencing program to connect film classes with working directors. Working with the Graphics Lab at USC's Institute for Creative Technologies, he helped develop a digital Cinerama-like process called Vistarama HD.

Kleiser was the main force in planning and filming Red Riding Hood (2004/2006). The work broke new ground in digital cinematography through the extensive use of interactive virtual sets. During 2006 in Lisbon, this movie was released for its debut at the 1st International Digital Cinema Festival.

Kleiser was inducted into Radnor High School's Hall of Fame on October 20, 2006. He was Chapman University's Dodge College of Film and Media Arts' Filmmaker in Residence for Fall 2010.

Kleiser is openly gay.

Filmography

Feature films

Filmmaking credits

Acting credits

Short films

Filmmaking credits

Acting credits

Other credits

Television

Awards 

 Nominee, Best Director - Saturn Awards, Honey, I Blew Up the Kid
 Nominee, Best Director - Saturn Awards, Flight of the Navigator

References

External links
 
 Official website
 Filmsbug.com
 DGA.org
 Ninafochproject.com

1946 births
American film directors
American television directors
Living people
Artists from Philadelphia
USC School of Cinematic Arts alumni
Gay men
Comedy film directors
LGBT people from Pennsylvania
LGBT film directors
LGBT television directors